Major General (Res.) Yitzhak Gershon has more than 32 years of distinguished military experience. Gen. Gershon commanded top combat units in the Israel Defense Forces, with much of his service on the front lines in Lebanon and Judea/Samaria. Gen. Gershon coordinated numerous special operations during the first Lebanon War and the “Defensive Shield” operation during the second Intifada, and led the Home Front Command in the second Lebanon war.

Military service
Gershon was drafted into the IDF in 1977. He volunteered to Sayeret Shaked. He served as a soldier and a squad leader and fought in Operation Litani. Later on he became an infantry officer after completing Officer Candidate School and returned to the Paratroopers Brigade as a platoon leader in the 890 "Efe" (Echis) paratroop battalion. In the 1982 Lebanon War Gershon led a paratroopers company of the 890 battalion during heavy fighting against PLO operatives and the Syrian Army. In Operation Law and Order Gershon commanded the 202 Paratroop Battalion. Gershon commanded a Regional Brigade in South Lebanon and later on commanded the 55th Paratroopers Brigade and the 35th Paratroopers Brigade. Afterwordfs he commanded the 98th Paratroopers Division. In the Second Intifada Gershon commanded Judea and Samaria Division during Operation Defensive Shield. In the years 2005-2008 he served as the Commander of Home Front Command, which he led through the 2006 Lebanon War. In November, 2008, Maj. Gen. Gershon joined Friends of the IDF as the National Director and CEO.

Gen. Gershon earned a BA and MA in Political Science from Haifa University.

References

External links 
Bio from the FIDF

Living people
Israeli generals
1958 births